Peeter Karin (also Peeter Karrin; 9 October 1877 Tartu Parish, Tartu County – 23 August 1944 Ropka Parish, Tartu County) was an Estonian politician. He was a member of Estonian Constituent Assembly. On 15 April 1920, he resigned his position and he was replaced by Johannes Rätsep.

References

1877 births
1944 deaths
Members of the Estonian Constituent Assembly